Behind the Mask of Zorro (aka E Zorro cabalga otra vez/ Zorro Rides Again), is a 1965 Italian western film directed by Ricardo Blasco. Tony Russel plays Zorro.

Cast
Tony Russel	... 	Patricio / Alfonso / Zorro
María José Alfonso	... 	Manuela
Roberto Paoletti		(as Robert Paoletti)
Jesús Puente	... 	General Esteban Garcia
Mirella Maravidi	... 	Alicia
Pepe Rubio 	...     Marcel (as José Rubio)
Ángela Rhu
Agustín González	... 	Captain
Sancho Gracia	... 	Juan (as Félix Sancho Gracia)
Enrique Navarro
María Gónzales
Rafael Corés
Enrico Salvatore
Aldo Cecconi
Joaquín Pamplona

External links
 

1965 films
1965 Western (genre) films
Spaghetti Western films
Spanish Western (genre) films
1960s Italian-language films
Zorro films
Films based on works by Johnston McCulley
1960s American films
1960s Italian films